Kosakowo may refer to the following places:
Kosakowo, Greater Poland Voivodeship (west-central Poland)
Kosakowo, Pomeranian Voivodeship (north Poland)
Kosakowo, Warmian-Masurian Voivodeship (north Poland)